Diego Nicolás Guastavino Bentancor (born 26 July 1984) is a Uruguayan footballer who currently plays as an attacking midfielder for Uruguayan club Atenas de San Carlos.

Career
Guastavino started his career playing for Sud América. After a brief spell in Deportivo Maldonado, he emigrated to Swiss football to play for Lugano. He returned home in 2007 to River Plate, and again at Deportivo Maldonado.
 
He came to FC Lyn Oslo in March 2008 on recommendation by and help from Terje Liverød and Matías Almeyda.

On 4 August 2009 he moved to SK Brann.

Querétaro
In June 2012, he signed a new deal with Primera División de México side Querétaro F.C.

He was released from his contract in September 2014 in order to leave a spot for Ronaldinho to join the team.

Career statistics

Honors

Club
Universitario de Deportes 
 Torneo Descentralizado: 2013

References

External links
 

1984 births
Living people
Footballers from Montevideo
Uruguayan footballers
Uruguayan expatriate footballers
Sud América players
Deportivo Maldonado players
FC Lugano players
Club Atlético River Plate (Montevideo) players
Lyn Fotball players
SK Brann players
Universidad de Concepción footballers
Querétaro F.C. footballers
Club Universitario de Deportes footballers
Independiente Santa Fe footballers
Liverpool F.C. (Montevideo) players
Carlos A. Mannucci players
Swiss Challenge League players
Liga MX players
Peruvian Primera División players
Eliteserien players
Chilean Primera División players
Categoría Primera A players
Uruguayan Primera División players
Uruguayan expatriate sportspeople in Chile
Uruguayan expatriate sportspeople in Mexico
Uruguayan expatriate sportspeople in Switzerland
Uruguayan expatriate sportspeople in Norway
Uruguayan expatriate sportspeople in Peru
Expatriate footballers in Chile
Expatriate footballers in Mexico
Expatriate footballers in Switzerland
Expatriate footballers in Norway
Expatriate footballers in Peru
Association football midfielders
Association football forwards